The Sin of Martha Queed is a 1921 American silent drama film directed by Allan Dwan and starring Mary Thurman, Joseph J. Dowling and Eugenie Besserer.

Cast
 Mary Thurman as Martha Queed 
 Joseph J. Dowling as Marvin Queed 
 Eugenie Besserer as Alicia Queed 
 Frankie Lee as Georgie Queed 
 Niles Welch as Arnold Barry 
 George Hackathorne as Atlas 
 Frank Campeau as David Boyd 
 Gertrude Claire as Grandmother

References

Bibliography
 Frederic Lombardi. Allan Dwan and the Rise and Decline of the Hollywood Studios. McFarland, 2013.

External links

1921 films
1921 drama films
Silent American drama films
Films directed by Allan Dwan
American silent feature films
1920s English-language films
American black-and-white films
Associated Exhibitors films
1920s American films